Water and Washington is a 2013 album by Mike Doughty. It is a rare bonus album available to participants in his PledgeMusic campaign for Circles, Super Bon Bon, and The Very Best of Soul Coughing. The album, available as a download to pledgers who ordered a copy, consisted of 20 acoustic tracks, including acoustic versions of the Soul Coughing songs on the album, as well as several tracks that were not included on the album.

Track listing

References 

2013 albums
Mike Doughty albums
Self-released albums